Teariki Numa (born 6 June 1999) is a Papua New Guinean sailor. He competed in the Laser event at the 2020 Summer Olympics.

References

External links
 

1999 births
Living people
Papua New Guinean male sailors (sport)
Olympic sailors of Papua New Guinea
Sailors at the 2020 Summer Olympics – Laser
Place of birth missing (living people)
Sailors at the 2014 Summer Youth Olympics